The Salzburg Slate Alps are a mountain range of the Eastern Alps, in the Austrian state of Salzburg. Situated within the greywacke zone, they could be regarded either as part of the Northern Limestone Alps or of the Central Eastern Alps.

Geography
The range is located between the Kitzbühel Alps (Tyrolean Slate Alps), the continuation of the greywacke zone beyond Lake Zell and Saalach river in the west, and the Dachstein massif in the east. In the north it is adjacent to the Berchtesgaden Alps, while in the south the Salzach and Enns valleys separates it from the High and Low Tauern ranges of the Alpine crest.

This inner-Alpine Mittelgebirge group, designated by the Alpine Club Classification of the Eastern Alps (AVE) based on its underlying rock, cannot be assigned from a geological perspective either to the Northern or the Central Alps, so it does not fit into the general tripartite division of the Eastern Alps and, as a result, is variously treated in the literature.

Subdivisions 
From a topographic perspective there are two subgroups, separated by the Salzach river where it bends northwards near St Johann im Pongau:
 the Dienten Mountains (Dientener Berge), which are known in the region as slate mountains in the true sense, running from west of the Salzach to Lake Zell and including the Hundstein massif and the Schneeberg-Hochglockner Group (Schneeberg-Hochglockner-Gruppe,  (Schneebergkreuz )
 the Fritztal Mountains (Fritztaler Berge), running from east of the Salzach to the Styrian border and the Dachstein massif, including the:
Hochgründeck in the triangle formed by Bischofshofen, St. Johann and Altenmarkt;
Rossbrand, which runs from Altenmarkt to the Mandling Pass near Radstadt;
Glutserberg, Halserberg and the Ramsauerleiten, three smaller regions that continue the Rossbrand to Schladming;
Gerzkopf, north of the Fritztal valley, which geologically belongs to the limestone region between the Tennen Mountains and the Dachstein, and are morphologically less related to the Dachstein massif and more to its southwestern outlier

External links 

 
Mountains of Salzburg (state)
Greywacke zone